The Valea Rea is a right tributary of the Tur in Romania. It discharges into the Tur between Boinești and Remetea Oașului. Its lower course is also considered the lower course of the Lechincioara.

References

Rivers of Romania
Rivers of Satu Mare County